Ajina-higashi is a Hiroden station on Hiroden Miyajima Line, located in Ajina, Hatsukaichi, Hiroshima.

Routes
From Ajina-higashi Station, there is one of Hiroden Streetcar routes.
 Hiroshima Station - Hiroden-miyajima-guchi Route

Connections
█ Miyajima Line

Jigozen — Ajina-higashi — Hiroden-ajina

History
Opened as "Ajina" on February 15, 1931.
Renamed to "Jigozen-Kenbyouin-mae" on January 1, 1954.
Renamed to "Ajina" when the hospital closed on March 1, 1972.
Renamed to "Ajina-higashi on November 1, 2001.

See also
Hiroden Streetcar Lines and Routes

References

Hiroden Miyajima Line stations
Railway stations in Japan opened in 1931